is a town located in Minamikawachi District, Osaka Prefecture, Japan. , the town had an estimated population of 13,172 in  5572 households and a population density of 930 persons per km².

Geography
Taishi is located in the southeastern part of Osaka Prefecture on the west side of Kongō Range and Katsuragi Mountains which separate Osaka from Nara Prefecture. The town is dominated by the peaks of  Mount Nijō to the east.

Neighboring municipalities 
Osaka Prefecture
 Habikino
 Tondabayashi
 Kanan
Nara Prefecture
 Kashiba
 Katsuragi

Climate
Taishi has a Humid subtropical climate (Köppen Cfa) characterized by warm summers and cool winters with light to no snowfall.  The average annual temperature in Taishi is 14.2 °C. The average annual rainfall is 1636 mm with September as the wettest month. The temperatures are highest on average in August, at around 26.3 °C, and lowest in January, at around 2.7 °C.

Demographics
Per Japanese census data, the population of Taishi has increased steadily since the 1970s.

History
The area of the modern town of Taishi was within ancient Kawachi Province. The area has been inhabited since the Japanese Paleolithic, due to the abundance of raw materials for stone tools from Mount Nijō. During the Asuka period, the Takeuchi Kaido, one of Japan's first "official roads", which connected the port of Sakai with Yamato Province was constructed. It was used by Ono no Imoko and others during the Japanese missions to Sui China. Around this time, Yamato's Asuka was called "Far Asuka", while the area around Taishi Town was called "Nearby Asuka". The town has many imperial tombs, including that of Emperor Bidatsu, Emperor Yōmei, Empress Suiko, and Prince Shotoku.

The villages of Isonaga and Yamada were established within Ishikawa District with the creation of the modern municipalities system on April 1, 1889.  On April 1, 1896 the area became part of Minamikawachi District, Osaka. The two villages merged on September 30, 1956 to form the town of Taishi, which was named after Prince Shotoku.

Government
Taishi has a mayor-council form of government with a directly elected mayor and a unicameral city council of 11 members. Taishi collectively with the cities of Tondabayashi and Ōsakasayama, and other municipalities of Minamikawachi District contributes two members to the Osaka Prefectural Assembly. In terms of national politics, the town is part of Osaka 15th district of the lower house of the Diet of Japan.

Economy
Taishi was traditionally dependent on agriculture and forestry.

Education
Taishi has two public elementary schools and one public middle schools operated by the town government. The town does not have and a public high school; however, there is one private high school.

Transportation

Railway 
Although the Kintetsu Railway Minami Osaka Line passes through the town, there is no passenger railway service. The nearest train station is Kaminotaishi Station in neighboring Habikino or Kishi Station in Tondabayashi.

Highways 
  Minami-Hanna Road

Local attractions 
Grave of Emperor Bidatsu
Grave of Emperor Yōmei
Grave of Empress Suiko
Grave of Prince Shotoku
Futagozuka Kofun, a National Historic Site 
Iwaya, a National Historic Site 
Rokutan-ji temple ruins, a National Historic Site 
Shinaga Jinja, with grave of Ono no Imoko
Eifuku-ji, Buddhist temple associated with Prince Shotoku

References

External links

Taishi official website 

Towns in Osaka Prefecture
Taishi, Osaka
Prince Shōtoku